Arcadia is an unincorporated community in Botetourt County, Virginia, United States.  It is located in the north of the county and is one of the northernmost points of the Roanoke Metropolitan Area.

Outdoor Recreation
Arcadia sits just off the exit of Interstate 81 and is in close proximity to both the George Washington National Forest and a number of great trout fishing streams, including Jennings Creek and North Creek.  Arcadia is also bounded by the James River and is a key access point for kayaking, canoeing, and other types of recreational activities along the river.  As such, Arcadia is well known in the Roanoke Valley as a great recreational place for mountain biking, hiking, fishing, hunting, and watersport activities.

Business
There are a few companies that do business in the Arcadia area, including Shell Oil Company, Twin River Outfitters, the Watstull Inn, and Foot of the Mountain Café, a popular local restaurant.

References

Unincorporated communities in Botetourt County, Virginia
Unincorporated communities in Virginia